The caciques are passerine birds in the New World blackbird family which are resident breeders in tropical South America north to Mexico. All of the group are in currently placed in the genus Cacicus, except the aberrant yellow-billed cacique (Amblycercus holosericeus), and the Mexican cacique (Cassiculus melanicterus) which constitute respective monotypic genera. Judging from mitochondrial DNA cytochrome b and NADH dehydrogenase subunit 2 sequence (Price & Lanyon 2002), the aberrant oropendolas band-tailed oropendola (Ocyalus latirostris) and casqued oropendola, Psarocolius oseryi (Ocyalus oseryi?) seem to be closer to the caciques.

The caciques are birds associated with woodland or forest. Most are colonial breeders, with several long, hanging, bag-shaped nests in a tree, each suspended from the end of a branch. Some species choose a tree that also contains an active wasp nest (such as Polybia rejecta) as a deterrent to predators (e.g. toucans), and females compete for the best sites near the protection of the wasp nest. The eggs are incubated by the female alone.

These are slim birds with long tails and a predominantly black plumage. The relatively long pointed bill is pale greenish, yellowish or bluish, depending on species, and most caciques have blue eyes (at least when adult). The female is typically smaller than the male.

Two species have the black plumage enlivened by a red rump, five have a yellow rump and in some cases yellow on the shoulders or crissum (the undertail coverts surrounding the cloaca). The two remaining species are all black with no bright colour patches. A single species, the Mexican cacique, has extensive yellow to the tail, but otherwise all caciques have largely black tails (something that separates them from the larger oropendolas).

Caciques eat large insects and fruit. Most are gregarious and typically seen in small groups. They are very vocal, producing a wide range of songs, sometimes including mimicry.

Most remain fairly common and are able to withstand some habitat modifications, but two west Amazonian species, the Ecuadorian and Selva caciques, are notably local and scarce.

The genus Cacicus was introduced by the French naturalist Bernard Germain de Lacépède in 1799. The type species was subsequently designated as the red-rumped cacique.

Species of Cacicus

See also
 Mexican cacique, Cassiculus melanicterus
 Yellow-billed cacique, Amblycercus holosericeus

References 

 ffrench, Richard; O'Neill, John Patton & Eckelberry, Don R. (1991): A guide to the birds of Trinidad and Tobago (2nd edition). Comstock Publishing, Ithaca, N.Y.. 
Hilty, Steven L. (2003): Birds of Venezuela. Christopher Helm, London. 
Jaramillo, Alvaro & Burke, Peter (1999): New World Blackbirds. Christopher Helm, London. 
Price, J. Jordan & Lanyon, Scott M. (2002): A robust phylogeny of the oropendolas: Polyphyly revealed by mitochondrial sequence data. Auk 119(2): 335–348. DOI: 10.1642/0004-8038(2002)119[0335:ARPOTO]2.0.CO;2 PDF fulltext
Stiles, F. Gary & Skutch, Alexander Frank (1989): A guide to the birds of Costa Rica. Comistock, Ithaca.

External links

 Cacique videos, photos and sounds—Internet Bird Collection

 
Icteridae